The Siniaka-Minia Faunal Reserve was established as an IUCN Category IV area in 1965 covering an area of , due its importance for preserving black rhinoceros. Siniaka-Minia has been managed by the nonprofit conservation organization African Parks since 2017 in partnership with Chad's government following the success of the African Parks partnership in Zakouma National Park.

Geography 
It is drained by the Siniaka River and Dorioum River, which are ephemeral in nature; some water holes remain for use during the summer months.

Flora and Fauna 
Vegetation in the southern part of the reserve is of Sudan savanna while in the north it consists of thorny bushes. 
The reserve, apart from preserving many threatened species, also contains greater kudu, red-fronted gazelle, oribi, roan antelope, lion and cheetah.

Conservation
Wild animals in the reserve are subject to degree of poaching by well armed hunters which has been difficult to control in view of lack  adequate personnel and equipment to carry out effective surveillance operations. It would still need attention as there are sufficient number of mammal species which need to be conserved.

References

Faunal reserves
Protected areas of Chad